Adriana Esteves Agostinho Brichta (born 15 December 1969) is a Brazilian actress. She has already been nominated twice to the International Emmy Award for Best Actress.

Career 

Daughter of Regina Esteves Agostinho and Paulo Felipe Agostinho, Adriana Esteves began her career as a model and got her first job on television as part of the series, "Star for a Day", on the TV show Domingão do Faustão.

Her first television appearance was as an extra on the soap opera Vale Tudo. She was also a successful model. Her character debut was in the 1989 telenovela Top Model.

In 2005, she took on the part of Celinha on the series, Toma Lá, Dá Cá. When the program aired on the Globo in 2007, Adriana, after maternity leave with her second child, reprised her role as Celinha.

While still acting in Toma Lá, Dá Cá, Adriana recorded the miniseries Dalva e Herivelto: uma Canção de Amor, playing the singer-songwriter Dalva de Oliveira. The miniseries aired in January 2010. In the same year, she starred the episode "A Vingativa do Méier" of TV series As Cariocas.

In 2011, she was cast as Julia, the protagonist of Morde & Assopra, who was part of a love triangle with scientist Ícaro (Mateus Solano) and farmer Abner (Marcos Pasquim). In 2012, she gained notoriety for interpreting the villainess Carminha on the soap opera Avenida Brasil, written by João Emanuel Carneiro. She received praise from critics and audiences alike for her performance and was enshrined as one of the greatest villainesses of Brazilian television — only surpassed by Odete Roitman of Vale Tudo, Nazaré Tedesco of Senhora do Destino and Flora of A Favorita.

Personal life 

Adriana's first boyfriend, who later became her husband, was jujutsu teacher Totila Jordan. They married in 1988 and remained together for two years, divorcing in 1990.

In 1994, she married actor Marco Ricca. A year later, she discovered he suffered from anxiety and panic disorder. In 2000, they had a son together, Felipe. In 2004, Ricca and Esteves got a divorce.

After months of separation from Marco, she started dating actor Vladimir Brichta. In February 2006, they married. In the same year, after a few months of marriage, their first son, Vicente, was born.  Adriana became the stepmother of Agnes Brichta, born in 1997, who was Vladimir Brichta's daughter from his first wife, singer Gena, who died in 1999 of leukemia.

Filmography

Television

Films

Theater

Awards and nominations

International Emmy Awards

Cartagena Film Festival

Gramado Film Festival

Festival de Cinema Itinerante da Língua Portuguesa

Grande Prêmio do Cinema Brasileiro

Troféu APCA

Troféu Imprensa

Melhores do Ano

Prêmio Contigo! de TV

Prêmio Extra de Televisão

Prêmio Qualidade Brasil

Prêmio Quem de Televisão

Troféu Internet

Prêmio Botequim Cultural

Meus Prêmios Nick

Troféu AIB De Imprensa

Campo Grande Latin American Film, Video and TV Festival

UOL TV and Celebrities Trophy

Shell Theatre Award

O Globo - Prêmio Faz Diferença

Sesc Festival Best Movies

Guarani Brazilian Film Award

References

External links 

1969 births
Living people
Actresses from Rio de Janeiro (city)
Brazilian television actresses
Brazilian telenovela actresses
Brazilian film actresses
Brazilian stage actresses
Universidade Gama Filho alumni